Ria Sabay (née Dörnemann; born 26 September 1985) is a former German female tennis player.

Sabay has won 5 doubles titles on the ITF tour in her career. On 25 February 2008, she reached her best singles ranking of world number 347. On 12 May 2008, she peaked at world number 238 in the doubles rankings. Sabay made her WTA tour debut at the 2006 Nordic Light Open. Sabay retirement from professional tennis 2013.

ITF finals

Singles (0–1)

Doubles (5–4)

References

External links 
 
 

1985 births
Living people
German female tennis players